Antora was a Bangladeshi film actress.

Biography
Antora started her career in Dhallywood as child actor but later she began to work as heroine. She acted in Premer Kasam where her co-star was Mahfuz Ahmed which was the first film of him. She died on 8 January 2014.

Selected filmography
 Boner Moto Bon
 Pagol Mon
 Premer Kosom
 Lady Rambo
 Amar Ma
 Dolon Chapa
 Shoytan Manush
 Fozor Ali Ashchhe
 Nag Naginir Prem
 Balika Holo Bodhu
 Lathi
 Goriber Ohongkar
 Hangor Nodi Grenade

References

Bangladeshi film actresses
2014 deaths